The Mull Lava Group is a Palaeogene lithostratigraphic group (a sequence of rock strata) in the west Highlands of Scotland. The name is derived from the Isle of Mull where they are most extensively seen, forming the bedrock across much of the island. They extend into the mainland peninsulas of Ardnamurchan and Morvern and also out to sea.

Lithology and stratigraphy
The Group consists of around 1800 m thickness of lavas erupted from the Mull Central Volcanic Complex and display a range of chemistries. The Group includes (in descending order, i.e. oldest last):
Mull Central Lava Formation
Mull Plateau Lava Formation
Ben More Pale Member
Ben More Main Member
Staffa Lava Formation 
Ardtun Conglomerate Member
Gribun Mudstone Member (known as the Beinn Iadain Mudstone Formation in Morvern)

These three formations were formerly known as the Staffa, Main and Pale ‘suites’ of the Plateau Group

References

Geological groups of the United Kingdom
Paleocene Series of Europe
Geology of Scotland